Nandi is a locality in the Western Downs Region, Queensland, Australia.

Geography 
The Glenmorgan railway line passes from the north-east (Dalby) to the north-west (Ducklo) of the locality. The locality is served by Nandi railway station.

The Moonie Highway also passes from the north-east to the north-west of the locality but to the south of the railway line.

History 
The Queensland Railways Department named the railway station on 8 October 1910. Nandi is an Aboriginal word meaning spur winged plover. The locality presumably takes its name from the railway station.

References 

Western Downs Region
Localities in Queensland